Taylor Curtis Lewan (born July 22, 1991) is an American football offensive tackle who is a free agent. He played college football at Michigan, where he twice received first-team All-American honors, and was selected by the Tennessee Titans in the first round of the 2014 NFL Draft. During his NFL career, Lewan was named to three consecutive Pro Bowls from 2016 to 2018.

Early years
Lewan was born in Sacramento, California on July 22, 1991 to Dave Lewan and Kelly Riley. Dave was an offensive lineman at the University of Minnesota. Prior to playing there, Dave Lewan played high school football for Oakridge Secondary School in London, Ontario, Canada, when his father's job took him to London from Minnesota. Taylor Lewan played his first three years of high school football for Cactus Shadows in Cave Creek, Arizona. He was a defensive end before transferring to Chaparral High School for his senior season, where he became an offensive lineman.

Lewan was rated as a four-star prospect by Rivals.com and Scout.com. He was selected as the fifth-best player in the state of Arizona and the 194th player nationally by Rivals.com. He was listed as the No. 3 most athletic offensive lineman and the fifth-most agile offensive lineman according to Rivals.com. He was a SuperPrep All-American and the nation's No. 10 overall offensive line prospect. He was selected to participate in the Under Armour All-America Game.

College career

2009 season

Lewan enrolled at the University of Michigan, where he majored in general studies, and redshirted his freshman year.

2010 season

Although Lewan did not play in the 2010 season opener, he appeared in 11 games, including nine as a starter, during the 2010 season.
In 2010, he took over the starting left tackle role from Mark Huyge in the fourth game versus Bowling Green. Michigan's offense displayed one of the top rushing attacks in the country, with quarterback Denard Robinson as the team's leading rusher behind protection by Lewan and fellow offensive linemen David Molk, Patrick Omameh, Steven Schilling, and Perry Dorrestein.

However, Lewan also displayed a knack for ill-timed, drive-killing penalties, mostly for false starts and personal fouls. These were attributed to his youth and aggressive nature on the field.

In the first quarter of the Purdue game, Lewan recovered a fumble and returned it for 11 yards.

After the 2010 season, Lewan was named by CollegeFootballNews.com to its Freshman All-America second team.

2011 season

As a redshirt sophomore, Lewan was a starting offensive tackle for the Wolverines.  After failing to draw a penalty in Michigan's early games, Lewan was praised for becoming a more intelligent player.  He was Michigan's starting left tackle in the first seven games of the season and was named to Phil Steele's Midseason All-Big Ten second team. Following the 2011 Big Ten Conference football season, he earned second team All-conference recognition. He was an honorable mention All-American selectee by the Pro Football Weekly.

2012 season

Prior to the 2012 season, Lewan was selected by the media as one of five Big Ten Offensive players to watch along with teammate Denard Robinson as voted by the media. Following the season, he was named the Big Ten Conference Offensive Lineman of the Year and named to the All-Big Ten first team by both the coaches and the media. Lewan was a 2012 College Football All-America Team selection by the Associated Press (1st team), ESPN (1st team), Walter Camp Football Foundation (1st team),  Lindy's Sports (1st team), Sports Illustrated (1st team), CBSSports.com (2nd team), FoxSportsNext.com (Scout.com 2nd team), and Pro Football Weekly (honorable mention). CBSSports.com also named Lewan along with punter Will Hagerup to their All-Big Ten team.

2013 season

After the 2013 season, Lewan was named Big Ten Conference Offensive Lineman of the Year for the second season in a row.

Professional career

2014–2015: Early career

Lewan was selected by the Tennessee Titans as the eleventh pick of the first round of the 2014 NFL Draft. He signed a four-year $11.48 million fully guaranteed contract and a signing bonus of $6.67 million. In his rookie year in 2014, Lewan played in 11 games starting six of them due to injuries, he was named to the PFWA All-Rookie team. The Titans finished the season with a 2-14 record, tying them with the Tampa Bay Buccaneers.

Coming into the 2015 season, Lewan was named the starting left tackle. He started in 15 games and allowed five sacks. The Titans finished with a league-worst record of 3-13.

2016–2018: Pro Bowl seasons

In 2016, Lewan remained the starting left tackle, starting all 16 games and blocking for DeMarco Murray as he led the AFC in rushing yards and finished third in the league.

On October 23, 2016, Lewan scored his first NFL touchdown on a 10-yard pass from Marcus Mariota in a 34-26 loss to the Indianapolis Colts.  Three weeks later, Lewan was ejected in the first quarter of a 47-25 victory over the Green Bay Packers after pushing a referee during an altercation with defensive tackle Letroy Guion. Lewan was selected to his first Pro Bowl for the 2016 season. The Titans finished with a 9-7 record and narrowly missed the playoffs. Lewan was ranked 72nd by his fellow players on the NFL Top 100 Players of 2017.

On April 25, 2017, the Titans picked up the fifth-year option on Lewan's rookie contract. Lewan started all 16 games in 2017 as the Titans finished with another 9-7 record. On December 19, 2017, Lewan was named to his second Pro Bowl. He was ranked 78th by his fellow players on the NFL Top 100 Players of 2018.

On July 27, 2018, Lewan signed five-year, $80 million contract extension with the Titans with $50 million guaranteed, making him the highest-paid offensive lineman in league history.

During a 27-20 Week 1 road loss to the Miami Dolphins, Lewan suffered a concussion after a blind side hit by Andre Branch. Lewan missed the rest of the game and the next game against the Houston Texans. He returned from concussion protocol prior in Week 3 against the Jacksonville Jaguars. Branch was fined $10,026 for taunting following the hit. During a 13-12 Week 5 loss to the Buffalo Bills, Lewan left the game early due to a foot injury. He had an MRI, but returned the next week against the Baltimore Ravens. On December 18, 2018, Lewan was selected to his third consecutive Pro Bowl. The Titans missed the playoffs due to a 33-17 loss to the Indianapolis Colts in the regular-season finale, finishing with a 9-7 record for the third consecutive year.  Lewan finished the 2018 season starting 15 out of 16 games. He was ranked 77th by his fellow players on the NFL Top 100 Players of 2019.

2019–2022
On July 24, 2019, Lewan announced in a video that he was suspended four games after failing a drug test for a banned substance. He was reinstated from suspension on September 30 and was activated on October 4. Lewan started all twelve of the Titans' remaining regular-season games, blocking for Derrick Henry as he won the league rushing yards title. The Titans finished 9-7 for the fourth consecutive year and qualified for the 2019-20 NFL playoffs, making it to their first AFC Championship Game since 2003 where they lost to eventual Super Bowl LIV champions, the Kansas City Chiefs. Lewan started all three of the Titans playoff games, blocking for Henry as he ran for almost 200 rushing yards in each of the first two games.

Lewan started the first five games of the 2020 season. During a Week 6 42-36 overtime victory over the Houston Texans, Lewan tore his ACL and was placed on injured reserve on October 19, 2020.

Lewan suffered a knee injury in Week 2 of the 2022 season and was ruled out for the year. On February 10, 2023, Lewan announced that he believed the Titans would release him and that he would consider retirement. The Titans released him twelve days later.

Legal troubles and controversy
On October 30, 2014, Lewan pleaded guilty to two misdemeanor charges of drunk and disorderly and disturbing the peace in a Washtenaw County district courthouse. The plea deal included the dismissal of one count of aggravated assault and two counts of assault and battery. These charges stemmed from an incident where he allegedly assaulted two Ohio State fans outside of the Brown Jug restaurant during the early morning hours of December 1, 2013.

Personal life
Lewan resides in Nashville with his wife, Taylin, and his daughters, Wynne and Willow. Taylor and former teammate Will Compton started a podcast in the summer of 2019 called “Bussin With the Boys” on the Barstool Sports network.

References

External links
 Tennessee Titans bio
 Michigan Wolverines bio
 Lewan at CBS Sports
 Lewan at ESPN.com
 Lewan at NCAA

1991 births
Living people
People from Cave Creek, Arizona
Sportspeople from the Phoenix metropolitan area
Players of American football from Scottsdale, Arizona
American football offensive tackles
Michigan Wolverines football players
All-American college football players
Tennessee Titans players
American Conference Pro Bowl players
People from Loomis, California
Barstool Sports people